W. Greg Ryberg was a Republican member of the South Carolina Senate, representing the 24th District from 1992 until 2012.

External links
South Carolina Legislature - Senator W. Greg Ryberg official SC Senate website
Project Vote Smart - Senator W. Greg Ryberg (SC) profile
Follow the Money - W. Greg Ryberg
2006 2004 2000 1996 Senate campaign contributions
2002 1996 State Treasurer campaign contributions

South Carolina state senators
1946 births
Living people